Nesozineus bisignatus is a species of beetle in the family Cerambycidae. It was described by M. Hoffmannin 1984.

References

Acanthoderini
Beetles described in 1984